Aleksey Borovtin (born 14 February 1954 in Kirov) is a Soviet ski jumper who competed from 1974 to 1981. He won two bronze medals in the individual normal hill event at the FIS Nordic World Ski Championships (1974, 1978).

Borovtin won the ski jumping competition at the 1977 Holmenkollen ski festival and also finished 4th in the Ski-flying World Championships that same year. He also participated in two Winter Olympics with a 15th place in the normal hill event at the 1976 Winter Olympics in Innsbruck as his best result.

External links

Holmenkollen winners since 1892 - click Vinnere for downloadable pdf file 

1954 births
Holmenkollen Ski Festival winners
Living people
Soviet male ski jumpers
Olympic ski jumpers of the Soviet Union
Ski jumpers at the 1976 Winter Olympics
Ski jumpers at the 1980 Winter Olympics
FIS Nordic World Ski Championships medalists in ski jumping
Sportspeople from Kirov, Kirov Oblast